The Zilek Bridge is a  long Bowstring-arch bridge that crosses the Batman River in southeastern Turkey. Located between the cities Diyarbakır and Batman, the bridge carries the Fevzipaşa-Kurtalan railway.

The bridge was constructed between 1939-44 as part of the extension of the railway from Diyarbakır to Kurtalan. When first completed, it was the second longest railway bridge in the country after the Karkamış Bridge. The old Zilek bridge has been flooded by the Ilısu Reservoir.

References

Bridges completed in 1944
Railway bridges in Turkey
Buildings and structures in Diyarbakır Province
Buildings and structures in Batman Province
Transport in Diyarbakır Province
Transport in Batman Province
1944 establishments in Turkey
Turkish State Railways
Tied arch bridges
Bridges in Diyarbakır